Cameron Michael Newbauer (born June 12, 1978) is an American college basketball coach. He most recently was the former head coach of the women's basketball program at the University of Florida from 2017 through 2021.

Biography
Newbauer played one season at Madonna College before returning to his hometown to complete his education at Indiana University – Purdue University Fort Wayne. At IPFW, he was a student assistant to the Mastodons and coached at Leo High School before receiving his elementary education degree in 2001. He and the  former Sarah Millender were married in 2011.

Coaching career
On May 17, 2013, after a dozen years as an assistant coach for successful programs at three Division I schools, Cameron Newbauer was introduced as the fourth head coach in the history of Belmont University women's basketball.

In the opening round of the 2014 WNIT, Coach Newbauer faced an Indiana team that included his sister, Andrea Newbauer, a senior guard.

On March 27, 2017, Newbauer was announced as the 10th head coach of the University of Florida women's basketball program.

On July 16, 2021, Newbauer announced he was resigning as Head Coach citing “personal reasons.” 

On Sept. 27, 2021 it was revealed that Newbauer's resignation was due to a pattern of physical and verbal abuse of both student players and staff.

Head coaching record

See also

 Florida Gators
 History of the University of Florida
 University Athletic Association

References

External links
Cameron Newbauer Profile - Florida Official Athletic Site

1978 births
Living people
American men's basketball players
American women's basketball coaches
Basketball coaches from Indiana
Basketball players from Fort Wayne, Indiana
Belmont Bruins women's basketball coaches
Florida Gators women's basketball coaches
Georgia Bulldogs basketball coaches
Georgia Lady Bulldogs basketball coaches
High school basketball coaches in the United States
Indiana University – Purdue University Fort Wayne alumni
Louisville Cardinals women's basketball coaches
Madonna Crusaders men's basketball players
Siena Saints women's basketball coaches
Sportspeople from Fort Wayne, Indiana